The Michael Richards Show is an American television sitcom created by Spike Feresten, Gregg Kavet, Andy Robin and Richards, that debuted on NBC from October 24 to December 19, 2000. The show starred Michael Richards as socially awkward but talented private detective Vic Nardozza who gets the job done despite his unusual methods.

Synopsis
The show revolved around Vic Nardozza (Michael Richards), an inept and clumsy private investigator working for McKay Investigative Services. Throughout the show, misunderstandings and poor decisions get in the way of the cases, but Nardozza always ends up getting the job done.

Cast
Michael Richards as Vic Nardozza
William Devane as Brady McKay
Bill Cobbs as Jack
Amy Farrington as Stacey Devers
Tim Meadows as Kevin Blakely

Production

Following the conclusion of his previous show, Seinfeld, Michael Richards reteamed with three former Seinfeld writers/producers in a comedy caper about a private eye in Los Angeles. When originally conceived, Richards wanted to differentiate his character from Kramer, the role he immortalized on Seinfeld. However, the network disagreed and decided that the character would share characteristics with his previous role. The character Nardozza was named after Richards' own mother, Phyllis Nardozzi.

In a 2015 interview, co-star William Devane recalled that making the show was "a nightmare", blaming both Richards' actions as the star of the show and the lack of a capable showrunner for its failure.

Episodes

Reception
The show received generally negative reviews and was cancelled within two months due to poor ratings.

References

External links 
 

NBC original programming
2000s American sitcoms
2000 American television series debuts
2000 American television series endings
Television shows set in Los Angeles
Television series by Warner Bros. Television Studios
Television series by Castle Rock Entertainment